John B. Tresvant (born November 6, 1939) is a retired American basketball player.

A native of Washington, D.C., he played high school football and baseball, but not basketball as he was cut from the team. After graduating, he joined the U.S. Air Force. He was stationed at Paine Field in Everett, Washington and repaired aircraft radar units. He grew several inches and was playing AAU basketball when Seattle University spotted him and gave him a scholarship after his military stint was up.

A 6'7" forward/center, Tresvant played three seasons at Seattle. He averaged 17.9 points and 14 rebounds per game as a senior, and 12.6 and 11.1, respectively, in his three-year career at Seattle. In 1963, he snared 40 rebounds in a game against the University of Montana at the Seattle Center Arena, the fourth-highest total in NCAA history.

He was selected in the fifth round (40th overall) of the 1964 NBA draft by the St. Louis Hawks. He played nine seasons in the league with St. Louis, the Detroit Pistons, the Cincinnati Royals, the Seattle SuperSonics, the Los Angeles Lakers, and the Baltimore Bullets, posting NBA career averages of 9.2 points and 6.3 rebounds.

After retiring from basketball because of a knee injury, Tresvant worked as an industrial arts teacher and middle school basketball coach. In 2006, he invented the Total Rebounder Exercise System (TRES), a basket designed for use in training young players in rebounding techniques.

Tresvant is divorced and the father of three grown children. He resides in Snohomish, Washington.

See also
 List of NCAA Division I men's basketball players with 30 or more rebounds in a game

References

1939 births
Living people
Baltimore Bullets (1963–1973) players
Basketball players from Washington, D.C.
Centers (basketball)
Cincinnati Royals players
Detroit Pistons players
Los Angeles Lakers players
Power forwards (basketball)
Seattle Redhawks men's basketball players
Seattle SuperSonics players
St. Louis Hawks draft picks
St. Louis Hawks players
American men's basketball players